This is a list of dishes found in Brazilian cuisine. Brazilian cuisine was developed from Portuguese, African, Native American, Spanish, French, Italian, Japanese and German influences. It varies greatly by region, reflecting the country's mix of native and immigrant populations, and its continental size as well. This has created a national cuisine marked by the preservation of regional differences. Brazil is the largest country in both South America and the Latin American region. It is the world's fifth largest country, both by geographical area and by population, with over 202,000,000 people.

Appetizers

Additional appetizer dishes

 Azul Marinho 
 Brote
 Canudinho
 Cartola
 Cocorote
 Espetinho
 Encapotado
 Folhado
 Filós
 Joelho
 Pão de frios
 Pão sapecado
 Little rolls
 Mariola
 Mentira
 Mexido
 Pé-de-Moça
 Quebra-queixo
 Queijo do Reino
 Queijo manteiga
 Sequilho
 Broinha
 Sobá
 Sorda

Side dishes

Main courses or Entrees

Additional main course dishes

 Afogado
 Arroz de hauçá
 Baião de dois
 Banana angu
 Barreado
 Bogged cow 
 Buchada de bode
 Caribéu
 Carneiro no buraco
 Carreteiro rice
 Cashew soup
 Chica doida
 Coconut fava
 Costela no bafo
 Cozido com pirão 
 Cuxá
 Escondidinho
 Estrogonofe (de carne ou de frango)
 Frango com quiabo
 Frango de cabidela
 Fubá suado
 Galinha cheia
 Gamba de couve
 Gembê
 Leitão maturado
 Lelê
 Maria-isabel
 Milk rice
 MIninico
 Mojica
 Mujeca
 Muma de siri
 Oven rice
 Panelada
 Party rice
 Paxicá
 Peixada catarinense
 Peixe na telha
 Picadinho
 Picado
 Piranha soup
 Pirão
 Pirarucu de casaca
 Porco no rolete
 Pururuca
 Leitão à pururuca
 Quarenta
 Quinhapira
 Quirera com suã
 Rabada
 Rubacão
 Sarrabulho
 Shrimp pumpkin
 Sururu
 Tropeiro beans
 Tutoo
 Xerém
 Xinxim de galinha

June Harvest Festival Foods (Comidas Típicas de São João)

• Canjica

• Mungunzá 

• Bolo de milho

• Pamonha

• Bolo de mandioca

• Cuscuz com charque

• Curau de milho

• Paçoquinha de colher

• Pé de moleque

• Bolo Souza Leão 

• Quindim

• Arroz Doce (rice pudding made with cinnamon sticks)

• Cocada

• Maria mole

• Queijadinha

• Tapioca de coco

• Quebra queixo

• Doce de abóbora 

• Doce de batata doce

• Quentão (warm alcoholic beverage)

Beverages

See also
 Amazonian cuisine
 List of Brazilian drinks
 List of Brazilian sweets and desserts

References

Dishes
Brazilian